Setareh or Setare is a feminine given name of Persian origin meaning "star" or "fate". Its equivalent in Tajik is Sitora.

It is related to the name 'Tara', "star" in Sanskrit, Hindi, Urdu, Marathi, Persian, Punjabi, Kurdish, Bengali, Telugu and Sinhala.
It is also related to the names Stella ("star" in Latin), Estelle (cf. the French "étoile") and their derivatives.

People
Notable people with the name include:
Setareh Eskandari (born 1974), an Iranian actress
Setareh Goodarzi, an Iranian-Dutch artist 
Setareh Pesyani (born 1982), an Iranian actress
Setareh Diba Tabatabaei, an Iranian actress

Notes

Persian feminine given names